Gualberto Jara  is a Paraguayan football manager.

Teams (assistant coach)
  Cerro Corá 1993
  Olimpia 1994
  Colo-Colo 1995-1998
  Racing de Santander 1999-2001
  Rayo Vallecano 2003
  Olimpia 2004-2005
  Cobreloa 2008

Teams (coach)
  Universidad de Concepción 2005-2006
  Colo-Colo 2009

Titles
  Colo-Colo 1996, 1997 and 1998 (Chilean Championship)

External links
 Profile at Colo-Colo.cl Profile at

1959 births
Living people
Paraguayan football managers
Paraguayan expatriate sportspeople in Spain
Colo-Colo managers
Expatriate football managers in Chile
Expatriate football managers in Spain
Club Sol de América managers